Ernest Casimir I (22 December 1573 – 2 June 1632) was a Count of Nassau-Dietz and Stadtholder of Friesland, Groningen and Drenthe.

Biography 
He was the 11th child of John VI, Count of Nassau-Dillenburg, and Countess Elisabeth of Leuchtenberg. After the death of his father, his counties Nassau-Dillenburg, Nassau-Siegen, Nassau-Dietz, and Vianden were divided among his five living sons. Ernest Casimir followed him as Count of Nassau-Dietz. In 1631, he inherited the small county of Spiegelberg near Lauenstein.

Ernest Casimir was primarily known as an outstanding military leader during the Eighty Years' War. He served under Maurice of Nassau, Prince of Orange, in the siege of the cities of Steenwijk and Oldenzaal, and Frederick Henry, Prince of Orange, during the Siege of Groenlo and the Siege of 's-Hertogenbosch. As Stadtholder of Groningen, he founded the Nieuweschans fortress in 1628. Although he owned little in Friesland, he was popular there, and people granted his heir the right to rule after his death.

He was killed by a bullet at the siege of Roermond while he was inspecting the trenches in June 1632. His son, Henry Casimir I, succeeded him as count of Nassau-Dietz and as Stadtholder of Friesland, Groningen and Drenthe.

Family 
In 1607, Ernest Casimir married Sophia Hedwig of Brunswick-Lüneburg, daughter of Henry Julius of Brunswick-Lüneburg. They had nine children:
 stillborn daughter (1608)
 stillborn son (1609)
 unnamed son (1610)
 Henry Casimir I, Count of Nassau-Dietz (21 January 1612 – 13 July 1640)
 William Frederick, Prince of Nassau-Dietz (7 August 1613 – 31 October 1664), married Albertine Agnes of Nassau
 Elizabeth (25 July – 18 September 1614)
 John Ernest (29 March – May 1617)
 Maurice (21 February 1619 – 18 September 1628)
 Elizabeth Friso (25 November 1620 – 20 September 1628)

Ancestors

References

External links 
 

1573 births
1632 deaths
Dutch stadtholders
People from Dillenburg
German people of the Eighty Years' War
17th-century Dutch military personnel